James Donnelly (1879–unknown) was an English footballer who played in the Football League for Leicester Fosse and Sheffield United.

References

1879 births
English footballers
Association football forwards
English Football League players
South Bank F.C. players
Sheffield United F.C. players
Leicester City F.C. players
Darlington F.C. players
Year of death missing